Fornoni is an Italian surname. Notable people with the surname include:

Giacomo Fornoni (1939–2016), Italian cyclist
Massimo Fornoni (born 1989), Italian footballer

See also
Foroni

Italian-language surnames